Universitas Terbuka (UT, literally Open University) is Indonesia state university and employs Open and Distance Learning (ODL) system to widen access to higher education to all Indonesian citizens, including those who live in remote islands throughout the country, as well as in various parts of the world. It has a total student body of 1,045,665 (as of 2019/2020 according to Indonesia's Ministry of Education and Culture Higher Education database).According to a distance education institution in the UK, which published "The Top Ten Mega Universities", UT-3 ranks closely with universities from China and Turkey.

Mission
UT's focus is on educating people who, for various reasons including lack of funding, rural isolation and full-time employment, do not have opportunity to attend conventional face-to-face higher education institutions.

The university's mission is:
 to expand the opportunity for quality higher education through the distance education system;
 to produce competent academicians and professionals who are able to compete globally;
 to increase participation in continuing education in order to create a knowledge-based society;
 to increase the quality and quantity of research and development in the distance education system, especially in distance higher education;
 to innovatively and continuously disseminate and share information on distance education especially on distance higher education;
 to strengthen national unity and integrity through the broad and equal provision of higher education;
 to increase cross-cultural understanding and networking through local, national and global partnerships;
 to produce academic products in distance higher education as well as in other fields of knowledge.

Accreditation
UT has been awarded the ‘International Accreditation’ and ‘Certificate of Quality’ by the International Council for Open and Distance Education (ICDE) Standard Agency (ISA), and ISO 9001:2000 by the Certification bodies, i.e. SAI Global and SGS. UT's study programs have also been accredited by The National Accreditation Board of Higher Education (BAN-PT).

Flexible learning
UT offers a learning flexibility system:
no time limitation to complete the study, i.e. no dropout system;
no time limitation on the year of graduation from senior high school, thus no age limit;
all year-round registration period;
flexible phase, place and time to study in accordance with student's own convenience;
use of multimedia learning materials, including printed learning materials accompanied by audio and video cassettes/CD, CD-ROM, radio and TV broadcast, as well as Computer-Assisted Instructions (CAI) and Internet-based learning materials.

As with other higher education, UT has implemented a semester credit system (SKS) to establish study load per semester. One semester is a unit of time and learning activities for about 15 weeks. Student study load expressed in units of SKS. To reach one credit, students are expected to learn the course material for three hours per week. Special to UT, one SKS synchronized with the three modules of teaching materials, while to study one module with 80 percent mastery it takes approximately 15 hours per semester.

Students can choose the kind of tutorial in accordance with the interests or abilities. Type of tutorials that can be followed by students is as follows:
 Face-to-face tutorial
 Tutorial by letter: Students can send questions about lecture material to the head of study program.
 Tutorial by radio, television and mass media: Students can follow the tutorial through the National Programmes/RRI wave radio. Tutorial on the radio is held five times a week. While the tutorial through TVRI can be listened to students on certain days. In addition, some local mass media provides tutorials for students of UT.
 Tutorial via the Internet

Some courses offered by UT is a practice or practicum courses. The practice or practicum conducted under the guidance of instructors. Implementation of practice or practicum can be done by the students individually or in groups using a kit or laboratory facilities in the area.

UT student learning outcome evaluation is conducted in the form of Independent Tasks, the tasks of the Special Design Front Face Tutorial, Practice or Practical Exam, Oral Exam, Final Exam Semester (UAS), and the Comprehensive Written Exam (UKT).

UT has two categories: the education program and regular program of non-regular program. The regular program can be followed by the general public. The non-regular program is administered programs in particular. At this time courses that are included in non-regular program is the Teacher Education Program Equalization D2 SD (PGSD) and S1-PGSD Program; the other courses included in the regular program.

Academic leave is one of convenience given to students who for any reason cannot complete the lecture. Students can take academic leave for four consecutive registration periods without having to report to UT. Before time runs out of academic leave, students must immediately register the course so student status is not lost.

Learning materials
Learning activities can be conducted at anywhere and any time.

Printed material (known as module) serves as the main learning medium, supplemented by non-printed materials such as recorded learning materials (audio video cassettes, CD, radio and TV), as well as computer-based learning materials (CAI and Internet based). To provide optimal education services to students who are spread all over the country and abroad, UT collaborates with agencies such as the PT Pos Indonesia, Bank Rakyat Indonesia (BRI), Televisi Republik Indonesia (TVRI), Radio Republik Indonesia (RRI), Local Government Radio Broadcast, Radio Broadcast Private Commerce, Regional Office/Department of Education, Education Attache Embassy of Indonesia, National Library, and local libraries.

Open University is working with agencies that want to improve the quality of its employees: government agencies, state enterprises, or private. They can follow the program in the UT or order a new study program to suit the needs of the office. UT has been to get the trust of the government to improve the quality of primary school teachers through the Equalization Program D2 Elementary School Teacher. In addition, UT has won the trust to improve the quality of human resources from the military, Bank Rakyat Indonesia (BRI), PT Bank BNI (Bank Negara Indonesia), Garuda Indonesia, Merpati Nusantara, Ministry of Agriculture, [./Https://id.wikipedia.org/wiki/Sekretariat%20Wakil%20Presiden%20Republik%20Indonesia Setwapres], and several other agencies.

Learning support service
The learning support services consist of academic and administrative services.

Academic Services
The academic services are provided through tutorials. There are two kinds of tutorials: face-to-face and at a distance via radio, television, and internet. Furthermore, practical works are also provided for courses that need practicum. Both tutorials and practical works are facilitated by qualified tutors, instructors, and or supervisors, who come from various well-known public and private universities as well as from UT itself. For certain courses, resource persons are sometimes invited from business, industry and other relevant sectors.

Administrative Services
Administrative services are emphasized in providing assistance to students in registration, obtaining learning materials, applying for credit transfer, and addressing other matters that can influence students’ study process.

Student Assessment
The assessment of student learning is based on: tutorial assignments, practical works, practicum assignments, and final examination. These components reflect students’ overall learning achievement and contribute to the semester final grades of the students.

UT administers final examinations at the end of every semester or twice a year. Final examinations are conducted as supervised pencil-paper tests simultaneously throughout the country. Students who take the Bachelor (Sarjana/S1) Programs are required to take the Program's Final Assignment at the end of the program as part of the requirements. Students who take the Master Programs (S2) are required to write Master Program's Final Assignment (a thesis) and pass the final oral examination. For certain courses and cases UT also offers the opportunity for students to take the examination on-line.

Final grades are announced via various methods including through UT website, and UPBJJ-UT.

Credit transfer
UT students may apply for credit transfer for courses previously taken from other accredited universities.

Operational networking
UT has 41 regional offices: 40 UPBJJ-UT and 1 PPM-LN. The UPBJJ-UT themselves are located in the capitals of each Indonesia 34 provinces in addition to 5 major cities of Bogor, Purwokerto, Surakarta, Jember, and Malang, in addition to the recently (re-)established UPBJJ in Dili, Timor Leste, in 2019, and the UT PPM-LN or foreign office. To support their operations, each UPBJJ-UT establishes close collaboration with various institutions, particularly with:
The local public and private universities for getting tutors, practicum instructors, and examination supervisors;
Local governments for conducting tutorials and examination, as well as for getting scholarships for students; and
Local radio and TV stations for relaying the tutorials and information about academic activities. The regular tutorials broadcast by the national radio stations (RRI).

At the national level, UT also has long standing collaborations with:
Q-Channel and TV-Edukasi for broadcasting UT's TV programs;
RRI for broadcasting radio tutorials;
BRI and BTN for receiving tuition fees and learning materials purchase from students; and
PT Pos Indonesia for delivering the learning materials, examination documents and other supporting materials.

Partnerships
UT has established partnerships with other institutions, including the Ministry of National Education, Ministry of Home Affairs, Navy, Ministry of Defense and Security, Ministry of Agriculture, Bank Negara Indonesia (BNI), Bank Rakyat Indonesia (BRI), Garuda Indonesia, Merpati Nusantara, PT Pos Indonesia, Central Bureau for Statistics, PT Indosat, PT Tugu Pratama, National Coordinating Agency for Family Planning (BKKBN), and Al-Zaitun Islamic Boarding School, Bank Tabungan Negara (BTN), National Archives of Indonesia (ANRI), National Civil Service Agency (BKN), School of Business and Management (STEKPI), PT Jakarta Software Komunikasi and all provincial agencies, regencies and towns in Indonesia.

UT also has close relationships with various international organizations such as the South-East Asian Ministers of Education Organization (SEAMEO), United Nations Educational, Scientific and Cultural Organization (UNESCO), and SEAMEO Regional Open Learning Center(SEAMOLEC).

UT is one of the founding members of the Asian Association of Open Universities (AAOU), and the Global Mega-University Network (GMUNET). In addition UT is also an active member of the International Council for Open and Distance Education (ICDE).

Academic programmes
UT has four faculties and one graduate program that offer more than 40 active study programmes, including doctoral programmes (S3), master programmes (S2), bachelor programmes (Sarjana/S1), diploma programmes (D3 and D4), and certificate programmes.

Faculty of Teacher Training and Educational Sciences 
Bachelor (S1) programmes
Indonesian and Literature Education
English Education
Mathematics Education
Physics Education
Chemistry Education
Biology Education
Economics Education
Pancasila and Civics Education
Primary School Teacher Education
Early Childhood Education Teacher
Educational Technology
Certificate programmes
Indonesian for Foreigners
Public Administration of District Area

Faculty of Social and Political Sciences
Bachelor (S1) programmes
Public Administration
Business Administration
Government Studies
Communication Science
Sociology
Law
Library Science or Archive
English Translation
Diploma 4(D4) program
Public Administration
Diploma 3(D3) program
Taxation

Faculty of Economics
Bachelor (S1) programmes
Economics Development
Sharia Economy
Management
Accounting
Tourism

Faculty of Science and Technology
Bachelor (S1) programmes
Mathematics
Statistics
Biology
Agribusiness, majoring in agricultural extension and communication/animal husbandry/fishery
Food Technology and Science
Urban and Regional Planning
Information System

Graduate programmes
Master (S2) programmes
Administration Science, majoring in public administration
Management
Marine Science, majoring in fishery management
Mathematics Education
English Education
Primary Education
Environment science

Doctoral (S3) programmes
Management
Public Administration

Facilities

Data processing services
Since its establishment in 1984, UT has provided computerized database analysis services. UT has up to date hardware and software facilities, including computer application programs that have been developed for specific needs of UT and other users of UT services.

Facilities for development, storage, and distribution of printed materials
UT has human resource and equipment in desktop publishing that can provide services in preparing printed materials. In addition, UT staffs have extensive experience in distributing printed materials to districts in Sumatera, Java, Bali, and West Nusa Tenggara.

Multimedia production facilities
UT has a Multimedia Production Center with facilities and human resources. The staffs are professionally trained in audio visual development and production in Indonesia and overseas. Several government and private institutions have utilized this, company profiles, promotions, and learning materials in the form of video, audio-tape, audio-graphics, slides, and VCD.

Sport facilities
UT provides room facilities for meetings, seminars, workshops. UT Convention Center and lodging has capacity of 3,000 people. The following facilities are:
Wisma I, II, and III with 106 rooms.
Jogging track, outdoor tennis courts, futsal court, basketball court and fitness center.
UT Convention Center (UTCC).

Human resource development services
UT offers the following programs:
Upgrading qualifications of human resource in:
Public Administration
Business Administration
Government Studies
Communication Studies
Taxation Studies
Language Services
Management, Accounting Studies
Economics and Development Studies
Applied Statistics, Mathematics, and Science
Food Technology
Agricultural Extension Programs

Education and training for managers and instructors:
Training needs analysis
Making plans for training center
Developing learning materials, either printed or electronic
Providing in-house training, either face-to face or at a distance
Training program Evaluation

Community extension programs:
Need Analysis for types of extensions programs
Development and production of extension programs media, either printed or electronic
Training for extension officers

Communication strategies:
Public Speaking
Public Relations Consultancy
Organizational Communication

Training for operators and computer programmers:
Word Processing
Database
Web Design
Publishing
Library Automation

Entrepreneurship:
Management
Supervision consultancy
Regional economic potential

Research and development
The Center for Research and Community Services of UT (LPPM-UT) has four centers:
Center of Institutional Research and System Development
Center of Science
Center of Community Services
Inter-University Center for Improving and Developing Instructional Activities (IUC-IDIA)

Research
The LPPM-UT specializes research and development in the following areas:
Open and Distance Education
Evaluation of Educational
Educational Management
Policy and Institutional Studies
Social Development
Regional Economic Development
Environmental Impact Analysis
Regional Development
Agriculture, Fishery, and Husbandry
Sciences
Instructional Media
Consultancy and Research Training
Monitoring and Evaluation

Development of management information systems
LPPM-UT provides:
Management Information System Design
Application of Computerized Management Information
Systems Application
website Design and Development
Information Systems Development
Information Systems Evaluation
Media Prototype Development

Community services
Community services include:
Training for continuing education programs.
Development of people's empowerment programs to improve the quality of life.
Development of networks and partnerships to support the continuing education and social services programs.
Professional consultancy services in people's empowerment, human resource, education, and development of both organization and society.

Development and Improvement of Instructions
The Inter-University Center for Improving and Developing of Instructional Activities (IUC-IDIA) has a mission to improve the quality of instruction at higher levels of education at open and distance higher education and conventional universities. The IUC-IDIA professional staff have experience in conducting needs analysis, developing programs, curriculum development, assessment of learning, evaluating instructional programs, developing the prototype of learning materials, developing multi-media course materials, developing computer-based tutorials, and professional training for educators, trainers, and instructor.

The IUC-IDIA services include:
Programs for Improving the Basic Skills of Instructional Techniques (PEKERTI)
Applied Approach (AA)
Development of Distance Learning Systems
Curriculum Development
Learning Materials Development
Tutor's Training
Instructional Media Development
Development of Computer-Assisted Tutorial
Achievement Evaluation
Classroom Action Research

The IUC-IDIA also provides consulting services for institution capacity building in education and training, particularly in the area of instructional activities and academic programs.

The IUC-IDIA has strategic alliances with other units within UT itself, with over 51 state-owned universities, and with education and training centers in 25 Departments, Colleges belonged to certain governmental departments, as well as education and training centers for specific fields (e.g. Banking, department stores, supermarkets, etc.)

References

External links
  University website
  English version
  History
UT regional offices address

Distance education institutions based in Asia
Universities in Indonesia
Distance education institutions based in Indonesia
Open universities
Educational institutions established in 1984
1984 establishments in Indonesia
Indonesian state universities